Victory Heights may refer to:

Australia
 Victory Heights, Queensland, suburb of Gympie
 Victory Heights, Western Australia, suburb of Kalgoorlie

United States
 Victory Heights, Seattle, neighbourhood
 Victory Heights, Wisconsin, unincorporated community

See also
Victor Heights, Los Angeles